DCTV, also known as Public Access Corporation of the District of Columbia, is a Washington, DC's television station dedicated completely to local programming created by and for DC and metropolitan area communities.

History
Mayor Marion Barry and Cable Commissioner William Lightfoot used funds from Public, educational, and government access and Corporation for Public Broadcasting to develop DCTV as a powerful tool for public benefit, giving DC residents the means to create television programming. It was launched in 1988 as a single cable channel streaming from a small cubicle in the basement of a DuPont Circle apartment building. The currently headquarters are located in the Brooks Mansion in Brookland, and transmit 7 channels on Comcast, RCN and Verizon FiOS.

Other services
DCTV produce local and original content for and from it community, and benefits it communities in other ways:

 Offering of accelerated media training courses, meeting rooms and access to state-of-the-art equipment including HD cameras, editing suites, and studios. DCTV programs are also streamed live, 24 hours a day, 7 days a week, accessed through DCTV.org.
 Listening and giving voice to diverse cultural groups and ideas, especially those that are under-represented in the media, empowering them to share their unique voices and to exercise their freedom of speech in an environment free of censorship or editorial control.
 Three online channels (live): DCTV (Comcast 95, RCN 10 and Verizon 10), Enrichment (Comcast 96, RCN 11 and Verizon 11) and Focus (Verizon 28).

See also

 Media in Washington, D.C.
 Brookland (Washington, D.C.)
 Public, educational, and government access 
 Corporation for Public Broadcasting 
 PBS
 WHUT-TV
 WETA-TV

References

External links
 
 DCTV (Comcast 95, RCN 10 and Verizon 10)
 Enrichment (Comcast 96, RCN 11 and Verizon 11)
 Focus (Verizon 28).

Television channels and stations established in 1988
DC-TV
1988 establishments in Washington, D.C.